Jaanus Veensalu (born 29 July 1964) is a retired football (soccer) defender from Estonia, who retired in 1997. His last club was JK Tervis Pärnu. Veensalu obtained a total number of six caps for the Estonia national football team during the early 1990s.

References

 Estonian Topscorers

1964 births
Living people
Estonian footballers
Estonia international footballers
Association football defenders